The Houston Push are a professional basketball team in Houston, Texas, and members of The Basketball League (TBL).

History
On December 31, 2020, it was announced that Retired NBA All Star, Steve Francis, was awarded the ownership of a new franchise called the Houston Push for the upcoming 2021 TBL season. 
 

On January 21, 2021 it was announced that Moochie Norris was named the team's head coach and general manager. Timothy McCaleb was announced as the Chief Marketing Officer.

Current roster

References

Former The Basketball League teams
Basketball teams established in 2020
Basketball teams in Texas